Sergey Dementev (born 1 June 1990) is an Uzbekistani athlete specialising in the shot put. He won a bronze medal at the 2017 Islamic Solidarity Games.

His personal bests in the event are 19.37 metres outdoors (Almaty 2015) and 18.95 metres indoors (Tashkent 2017).

International competitions

References

1990 births
Living people
Uzbekistani male shot putters
Athletes (track and field) at the 2014 Asian Games
Asian Games competitors for Uzbekistan
Islamic Solidarity Games medalists in athletics
21st-century Uzbekistani people